{{DISPLAYTITLE:C12H19NO2S}}
The molecular formula C12H19NO2S (molar mass: 241.35 g/mol) may refer to :
 2C-T-2
 Aleph (psychedelic)
 Meta-DOT
 Ortho-DOT
 TME (psychedelics)
 Thioescaline
 TOMSO